Galatea , also known as Neptune VI, is the fourth-closest inner moon of Neptune. It is named after Galatea, one of the fifty Nereids of Greek legend, with whom Cyclops Polyphemus was vainly in love.

Discovery 

Galatea was discovered in late July 1989 from the images taken by the Voyager 2 probe. It was given the temporary designation S/1989 N 4. The discovery was announced (IAUC 4824) on 2 August 1989, and mentions "10 frames taken over 5 days", implying a discovery date of sometime before July 28. The name was given on 16 September 1991.

Physical properties 

Galatea is irregularly shaped and shows no sign of any geological modification. It is likely that it is a rubble pile re-accreted from fragments of Neptune's original satellites, which were smashed up by perturbations from Triton soon after that moon's capture into a very eccentric initial orbit.

Orbit 
Galatea's orbit lies below Neptune's synchronous orbit radius, so it is slowly spiralling inward due to tidal deceleration and may eventually impact the planet or break up into a new planetary ring system upon passing its Roche limit due to tidal stretching.

Galatea appears to be a shepherd moon for the Adams ring that is  outside its orbit. Resonances with Galatea in the ratio 42:43 are also considered the most likely mechanism for confining the unique ring arcs that exist in this ring. Galatea's mass has been estimated based on the radial perturbations it induces on the ring.

Notes 

Since Galatea is irregularly shaped, the actual surface gravity and escape velocity will vary significantly between different positions on the surface.

References

External links 

 Galatea Profile by NASA's Solar System Exploration
 Neptune's Known Satellites (by Scott S. Sheppard)

Moons of Neptune
Astronomical objects discovered in 1989
Moons with a prograde orbit